Michael Fleischer may refer to:
Michael Paul Fleischer, American businessman
Michael Fleischer (mineralogist) (1908–1998), American mineralogist, first chairman of the IMA-CMNMC
Michael Fleisher (1942–2018), American comic writer